Qareh Naz-e Olya (also Romanized as Qareh Nāz-e Olyā; also known as Qarah Nāz-e Bālā) is a village in Qareh Naz Rural District, in the Central District of Maragheh County, East Azerbaijan Province, Iran. At the 2006 census, its population was 120, in 31 families.

References 

Towns and villages in Maragheh County